Claude Mydorge (1585 – July 1647) was a French mathematician. His primary contributions were in geometry and physics.

Mydorge served on a scientific committee (whose members included Pierre Hérigone and Étienne Pascal) set up to determine whether Jean-Baptiste Morin's scheme for determining longitude from the Moon's motion was practical.

Works

External links
 

1585 births
1647 deaths
17th-century French mathematicians